Mohammad Mainuddin Ahmed (Selim Al Deen) (18 August 1949 – 14 January 2008) was a Bangladeshi playwright and theatre artist. He was the founder chairperson of the Department of Drama and Dramatics at Jahangirnagar University. He was awarded Bangla Academy Literary Award in 1984 and Ekushey Padak in 2007 by the Government of Bangladesh for his contribution to theatre  and won the Independence Award in 2023 for his contribution to the field of literature.

Early life and education
Deen was born as Mainuddin to Mofizuddin Ahmed and Firoza Khatun in Shenerkhil village of Sonagazi Upazila of Feni on 18 August 1949. He was the third of their seven siblings. He assumed this pen name later. His school life started in 1954. He travelled with his father to different parts of the country and received education in many institutions as his father was doing a transferable government job in the department of Customs and Excise. He passed matriculation examination in 1964 from Mongal Kandi Bohu Mukhi High School and ISc from Feni College in 1966. In 1967m he was admitted to the University of Dhaka to study Bengali literature. But later he graduated from the Karatia College, Tangail. He came back to the University of Dhaka and obtained his MA degree from the Bengali Department. In 1995, he earned his PhD from Jahangirnagar University. His first job was in an advertising firm as a copywriter. In 1974, he joined Jahangirnagar University as a lecturer. He married Begaumjadi Meherunnisa Parul the same year.

Theater debut
Deen was attracted to reading literary works at a very young age. As he turned on to admit into Dhaka University in 1966, he decided to become a career writer. In the early years, Deen wanted to be a poet and published some of poems he composed. But soon he realised that poetry was not his cup of tea. It was his instructor and a playwright Munier Chowdhury who encouraged him to focus attention on drama. First he started reading plays and study the life of playwrights. Then he started to write plays himself. He wrote his first drama in 1968 while still a university-student. He wrote a play for Bangladesh Television styled  (later renamed ) which was broadcast in 1970. Story about snakes') was staged in 1972

Deen's close study of European culture is reflected in his initial plays.

However soon he realised that the tales of rural farmers are no less heroic than the Herculean feats of Achilles or Prometheus. This realisation changed his mindset and diverted his attention to the lives of his countrymen.

Career
Deen carried out extensive research for his doctoral dissertation in which he proved that the history of Bengali drama is older than that of European drama. He moved earth and heaven to collect data in support of his thesis. During 1977 to 1979, Selim Al-Deen studied Bengali  which prompted him to write his first unique drama . The success of  instilled in him enormous confidence that using tradition as the foundation was pregnant with success.

He also brought the folklore tradition called  to his dramas like .

Upon the realization that Bengali drama was lagging far behind other branches of Bengali literature, Selim Al-Deen did not divert his attention away and continued his focus. He started experimenting with form and style to explore different possibilities. The early nineties saw Selim Al-Deen focusing on a new style derived from folk traditions. In , the  style was used.  was traditional of play that was being ignored for a long time. He resorted to the same format while composing .

Dhaka Theatre
Deen was one of the founding members of Dhaka Theatre which is a leading theatre group of the country and rendered vital contribution in advancing the progressive drama movement. Notably, Dhaka Theatre staged almost all of Selim's plays. He and his fellow artists ran the theatre movement across rural Bangladesh to popularise the culture in rural areas of Bangladesh.

Achievements
Since the 1980s, Deen has played a pivotal role in the theatre movement of Bangladesh. Apart from his active involvement with Dhaka Theatre, his fundamental contribution was introduction of a novel sense of direction to modern Bengali Drama, based on tradition. Al-Deen has also been one of the key organisers of Bangladesh's village theatre movement. He took the monumental task of creating the only dictionary on dramatics available in Bengali. Having been awarded almost all national recognitions possible in the field of theatre, Deen's work is studied at many universities across the world. Several of his plays have been translated into other languages. They have been staged outside Bangladesh too. In fact, he is one of few Bangladeshi writers to have his plays staged by West Bengal troupes. He helped to build the Dramatics department of Jahangirnagar University and involved there as a teacher for 30 years.

Deen secured mass popularity when his plays were broadcast through television.

Deen's play  aired on Bangladesh Television on 2 January 2005 was achieved immediate popularity. The main cast was Shahriar Nazim Joy, Dipa Khondokar, Mamnun Emon, Kumkum Hassan and Anuja. The play was directed by Nayeem Imtiaz Nayemul.

Works

Books
His only novel is titled . He compiled the seminal theatre dictionary . His plays are included in the textbook curricula of the University of Dhaka and Jahangirnagar University, Jadavpur University and Rabindra Bharati University.

Deen was also the founder of fusion theory and neo-ethnic theatre.  is one of the few instances of neo-ethnic theatre in Bengali literature.

Based on unmixed rural settings,  was written by Selim Al Deen jointly with Masum Reza. This is a 111-episode TV play produced by NTV.

in the USA and India
 by Deen premiered in 1990 at the Antioch College, Yellow Springs, Ohio, United States. It was translated into English as The Wheel by Syed Jamil Ahmed and adapted by Steve Friedman. The play was jointly directed by Syed Jamil Ahmed and Denny Partridge. Inspired by its success, Denny Partridge directed The Wheel again at Barnard's Minor Latham Playhouse, in New York City on 13, 14 and 15 November 2003. The cast featured Ian Anthony, Ann Cheung, Samantha Debicki, Ariana Getz, Oscar Olivo, Lindsay Strachan, Chloe Waters-Wallace, Matt Wilstein and Jessica Valadez. In 2006, Syed Jamil Ahmed directed the play in Hindi (titled ) at the National School of Drama, New Delhi, India.

Films
Kittonkhola was made into a film in 2000. Directed by Abu Sayeed, the film was adapted from the stage play written by Deen. Featuring Raisul Islam Asad and Naila Azad Nupur, the film brought to light the lives of jatra artistes and their struggles to make a living off the dying performing art.

Unfinished projects
As many as six plays written by Deen are available which remain to be staged. Before his death, he was working on a new play styled  ('Pile of Bones') that remains unfinished. He conceived of establishing a World Cultural Centre in Dhaka, his dream project.

Awards
 Bangla Academy Literary Award (1984)
 Kathak Sahitya Puroshkar (2002)
 Nandikaar Puroshkar (1994)
 Best Tele-playwright Award (1994)
 National Cinema Award for best dialogue (1994)
 Khaleqdad Chowdhury Sahitya Puroshkar (2001)
 Ekushey Padak (2007)
 Alokta Sahitya Puroshaker (2007)
 Munier Chowdhury Sammanona by Theatre (2003)

Death and legacy
Deen died at Labaid Cardiac Hospital in Dhaka on 14 January 2008 after being admitted to hospital following a cardiac attack on 11 January. The same day he was scheduled to be flown to Thailand for a better medical care. He had been suffering from heart disease, high blood pressure, kidney and diabetic problems. He was given life support as his condition deteriorated quickly and became critical.

After janaza at different places, he was buried on 16 January 2008 at a graveyard near the Jahangirnagar University central mosque.

The road to his village home in Senerkhil has been named after him. The road is known as Selim Al Deen Road that connected Notun Bazar and Darograr Hat. A government primary school has also been named after him and his mother. The school is located in front of his village residence.

Sexual misconduct allegation 
During the height of Me Too movement, a former student of Deen, Musfiqa Laizu, came out and accused him of sexually exploiting students.

References

External links
 

1949 births
2008 deaths
People from Feni District
University of Dhaka alumni
Jahangirnagar University alumni
Bangladeshi male writers
Bengali-language writers
20th-century dramatists and playwrights
Male dramatists and playwrights
Bangladeshi dramatists and playwrights
Academic staff of Jahangirnagar University
Recipients of Bangla Academy Award
Recipients of the Ekushey Padak
Best Dialogue National Film Award (Bangladesh) winners
Best Story National Film Award (Bangladesh) winners
20th-century screenwriters